Catholic High School for Boys is a private, Catholic high school located in Little Rock, Arkansas, established in 1930.

Activities

Extracurricular activities 
The Catholic High School for Boys mascot is The Rockets, with purple and gold serving as its school colors.

Athletics 
The Little Rock Catholic Rockets compete in the 7A Classification, which is the state's largest classification, administered by the Arkansas Activities Association. The Rockets compete in the 7A/6A Central Conference. Interscholastic activities include: football, golf, basketball, bowling, cross country running, soccer, swimming and diving, wrestling, track and field, and baseball.

The Rockets have won the following state championships:
Baseball: 1971, 1972
 Football: 1984, 1985
 Golf: 1964, 1965, 1967, 1985, 1989, 1990, 1991, 2006, 2021 (boys)
 Swimming and diving: 1962, 1977, 1980, 1982, 1983, 1984, 1987, 1989, 2002, 2003, 2004
 Soccer: 2002, 2007, 2009, 2010, 2011 (7A)
 Wrestling: 2014 (7A/6A)
 Tennis: 1968, 1971, 1973, 1974, 1975, 1976, 1980, 1981, 1983, 1985, 1986, 1987, 1991, 1992, 1999, 2015, 2016, 2017, 2018, 2019 (boys)
 Basketball: 2008 (7A)

Alma Mater 
Translated as Kind Mother, Alma Mater is the traditional way of referring to one's school, especially when one feels a debt of gratitude to it. The song which celebrates this attachment to Catholic High School was written in the 1960s by Mr. Thomas Morrissey:

"Proudly we speak your name,

proudly wear your colors.

Friendships made within your walls

will mellow through the years.

We, in some distant day,

may brush away a tear,

born of memories as these,

we hold so very dear."

Fight Song 

"Go, Rockets, down the field!

You gallant fighters, one and all!

Go, Rockets, never yield!

You've got the courage and the will to win them all!

Fight! Fight! Right to the end!

With no excuse nor alibi!

Courage unfaltering will bring

a victory to Catholic High!"

Clubs and traditions 

In addition to athletic competition, Catholic sponsors a JROTC unit, which participates in: Drill, Physical Fitness, Academic, and Cyber Patriot competitions, as well as participating in Quiz Bowl, debate, and speech competitions.

 The MCJROTC unit was founded by Major General Sidney S. McMath (USMC), former Governor of Arkansas, on 27 November 1967, when General Clifford B. Drake (USMC) official presented the unit colors during Charter Day ceremonies, becoming the third commissioned JROTC program in the nation.  The early cadets who attended the program were referred to as "Sid's Kids".  The current Marine instructors are Sgt. Maj. R.S. Jernigan (Ret. USMC) and Col. C. Johnson (Ret. USMC). The unit contains female cadets from Mount St. Mary Academy,. The unit as a whole receiving many awards, including:
         Designated Naval Honor School, Program with Distinction (2009, 2010, 2011, 2012, 2013, 2014, 2015, 2016) 
         Marine Corps Reserve Association, Region V Best Marine Corps Unit (2010, 2011, 2012, 2014, 2015, 2016) 
          JROTC National Physical Fitness Champions ( 2010, 2011, 2012, 2015, 2016, 2017) 
          JROTC Academic Bowl, Best MCJROTC Academic team (2016)
 The JROTC program sponsors many different teams, such as: Academic, Armed Drill, Armed Exhibition Drill, Rifle, Cyber Patriot, and Physical Fitness.
 The Rockets are the 2009 Quiz Bowl state champions.
 The Rockets are the 2021 Chess state champions.

Notable alumni

 Dr. John C. York (Class of 1967) Cancer researcher and Co-Chairman, San Francisco 49ers
 French Hill (Class of 1975), Current United States Congressman
 Gil Gerard (Class of 1961) Actor and star of television's Buck Rogers in the 25th Century
 Stephen Jones (Class of 1983) Former Arkansas Razorbacks football player, son of Dallas Cowboys owner Jerry Jones and current Executive Vice President, CEO, and Director of Player Personnel for the team
 Jerry Jones Jr. (Class of 1988) Son of Dallas Cowboys owner Jerry Jones and Chief Sales and Marketing Officer and Executive Vice President of the Dallas Cowboys
 Jimmy Kremers Former MLB Player (Atlanta Braves)
 Pat Seerey Former MLB Player (Cleveland Indians, Chicago White Sox)
 Jake Bequette Football player

References

External links

Catholic secondary schools in Arkansas
High schools in Little Rock, Arkansas
Educational institutions established in 1930
Boys' schools in the United States
Roman Catholic Diocese of Little Rock
Catholic high schools in the United States
Private high schools in Arkansas
1930 establishments in Arkansas